The 1983 U.S. Pro Indoor – Singles was an event of the 1983 U.S. Pro Indoor men's tennis tournament. The draw consisted of 48 players, 16 of them were seeded. First-seeded John McEnroe was the defending champion. He successfully defended his title, defeating second-seeded Ivan Lendl, 4–6, 7–6(9–7), 6–4, 6–3 in the final, breaking a seven-match losing streak against the Czech.

Seeds

  John McEnroe (champion)
  Ivan Lendl (final)
  Mats Wilander (third round)
  Gene Mayer (third round)
  Peter McNamara (quarterfinals)
  Steve Denton (third round)
  Eliot Teltscher (quarterfinals)
  Sandy Mayer (second round)
  Kevin Curren (second round)
  Jimmy Arias (second round)
  Brian Gottfried (quarterfinals)
  Wojtek Fibak (quarterfinals)
  Tomáš Šmíd (third round)
  Mel Purcell (second round)
  Henri Leconte (third round)
  Tim Mayotte (semifinals)

Draw

Finals

Top half

Section 1

Section 2

Bottom half

Section 3

Section 4

References

External links
 Main draw

U.S. Pro Indoor
1983 Grand Prix (tennis)